Booches is a bar, restaurant, and pool hall at 110 S. 9th Street in downtown Columbia, Missouri that was established in 1884. It is the oldest pool hall in Columbia and is known for its hamburgers. It is located near the University of Missouri and has traditionally been frequented by college students. In 2016 Booches was inducted into the Boone County Hall of Fame at the Walters-Boone County Historical Museum.

Overview
Booches was established in 1884, has had six locations in downtown Columbia, and has been at its present location on Ninth Street since 1928. It is the oldest pool hall in Columbia and has full-sized pool tables, snooker tables, and one billiard table (no pockets) for three cushion billiards play. Booches is known for its hamburgers, which are served on wax paper, and a 2000 report in USA Today listed it as one of the best 25 burger restaurants in the United States. In 2005, Jerry Shriver of USA Today included Booches' hamburger on the list of top 25 dishes from his "Down-home Dining" project.  In 2019, Joan Niesen and Laken Litman of Sports Illustrated named Booches' hamburgers as the "#1 Greatest College Town Eats" in the nation.

Booches is likely named after its founder, Paul Blucher "Booch" Venable, who was nicknamed "Booch" as a child by writer Eugene Field. The restaurant has gone through many owners in its time and was a male-only establishment until the 1970s. During the times of racial segregation in the United States, the establishment would not serve African Americans.

During the mid to late 1970s, the then-owners of Booches edited and published four issues of the Review la Booche, a nationally published literary journal featuring poetry, prose, sketches, and photographs by contributors of such prominence as John Ciardi, William Stafford, Elton Glaser, Frank Stack, and Richard Eberhart, along with local and regional contributors. The review was revived in 1990 for a fifth and final issue.

Booches is located close to the University of Missouri, and it has traditionally been a haven for University of Missouri and St. Louis Cardinals sports fans. The establishment has a considerably more family-friendly atmosphere compared to its rougher atmosphere in past times. It has been described by some in contemporary times as a dive bar and a melting pot.

Booches was inducted into the Boone County Hall of Fame at the Walters-Boone County Historical Museum in 2016.

In popular culture
Booches was included in the film Norm, which aired on ESPN's SEC Network. Norm depicted the career of the former University of Missouri basketball coach Norm Stewart, who was a regular patron of the establishment.

See also
 List of bars
 List of hamburger restaurants

References

External links
 
 "Booches: The best burgers on wax paper". Rockmnation.com. – Provides a comprehensive overview of the establishment and its history

1884 establishments in Missouri
Bars (establishments)
Billiard halls
Buildings and structures in Columbia, Missouri
Hamburger restaurants
Restaurants established in 1884
Restaurants in Columbia, Missouri
Drinking establishments in Missouri